Chargharey Gewog is a former gewog (village block) of Samtse District, Bhutan. Chargharey Gewog, together with Chengmari Gewog, comprises part of Chengmari Dungkhag (sub-district).

References 

Former gewogs of Bhutan
Samtse District